Selbstportrait Vol. III "Reise durch Arcadien" is the fifth solo album by German keyboardist Hans-Joachim Roedelius, best known for his work with Cluster, Harmonia, and Aquarello.  It is the third of seven albums in Roedelius' Selbsportrait series of recordings.  Selbstportrait Vol. III "Reise durch Arcadien" was recorded in Forst, Germany in 1978 and in Blumau, Austria between 1978 and February, 1980.  The album was released by Sky Records in 1980.

Much like the previous volumes of the Selbstportrait series the music can be described as ambient or new age with gentle melodies.

Track listing
"Sonntags" - 3:45
"Geburtstag" - 1:50
"Fieber" - 6:06
"Hockzeit" - 3:05
"Geradewohl" - 3:50
"Erinnerung" - 3:25
"Zuversicht" - 11:05
"Stimmung" - 9:05

Personnel
 Hans-Joachim Roedelius - piano, keyboards

References

 Album liner Notes
 Elmulab Sky Records (in German)  Retrieved September 29, 2007.
 Rate Your Music Selbstportrait III: Reise durch Arcadien  Retrieved September 29, 2007.

1980 albums
Hans-Joachim Roedelius albums